The Antlia-Sextans Group is a small grouping of galaxies in the constellations Hydra, Sextans, Antlia and Leo. It is generally considered to be at the very edge of the Local Group and thus part of it. However, other researchers indicate it is an independent group, and thus the nearest group to the Local Group. It is, on average, approximately 4.3 million light-years away from the Milky Way.

Members 

The Antlia-Sextans Group consists of the galaxies NGC 3109, Sextans A, Sextans B, Antlia Dwarf, Leo P and Antlia B. Leo A might also belong to the group, but this is considered unlikely.

NGC 3109 
NGC 3109 is the largest and dominant member of this group, with a diameter of 25,000 light-years, one-fifth to one-quarter the diameter of the Milky Way. It was the first discovered member of the group, discovered in 1835. It is also second closest to Earth, at a distance of 4.338 million light-years away. It was thought to be an irregular galaxy, but is now theorized to possibly be a barred spiral. It seems to be a galaxy with no central core. Based on spectroscopy of blue supergiants in NGC 3109, it is known that the galaxy has a low metallicity, similar to that to the Small Magellanic Cloud. It is one of the most metal-poor galaxies in the Local group, if it is included.
NGC 3109 seems to contain an unusually large number of planetary nebulae for its luminosity. It also contains a substantial amount of dark matter.

From measurements of the neutral atomic hydrogen in the galaxy, it has been found that the disk of NGC 3109 is warped.

Antlia Dwarf 

Antlia Dwarf is the smallest and closest galaxy in the group, only 1,500 light-years in diameter at a distance of 4.28 million light-years. The gas in the Antlia Dwarf galaxy has the same radial velocity as a warp in the disk of NGC 3109, indicating that the two galaxies had a close encounter approximately one billion years ago.

Sextans A 

Sextans A is 5,000 light-years in diameter, and square-shaped, and contains numerous star clusters, located at the distance of about 4.31 million light-years away. Sextans A has a peculiar square shape. Massive short-lived stars exploded in supernovae that caused more star formation, triggering yet more supernovae, ultimately resulting in an expanding shell. Young blue stars now highlight areas and shell edges high in current star formation, which from the perspective of observers on Earth appears roughly square. The 10.4m telescope Gran Telescopio Canarias recently observed the OB-type stars that power the giant HII regions. Sextans A have formed a pair with the most remote galaxy in the group, Sextans B.

Sextans B 

Sextans B is the second largest galaxy in the group, with a diameter of 6,000 light-years. Sextans B is the most distant from Earth in the group, at 4.44 million light-years away. Sextans B has a uniform stellar population, but the interstellar medium in it may be inhomogeneous. Its mass is estimated to be about 2 × 108 times the mass of the Sun, of which 5.5 × 107 is in the form of atomic hydrogen. Star formation in the galaxy seems to have proceeded in distinct periods of low intensity, separated by shorter periods of no activity. The existence of Cepheid variables in the galaxy implies that Sextans B contains at least some young stars. The metallicity of Sextans B is rather low, with a value of approximately Z = 0.001.

Five planetary nebulae have been identified in Sextans B, which is one of the smallest galaxies where planetary nebulae have been observed. These appear point-like and can be identified by their spectral emission lines. It also contains a massive globular cluster.

Leo P 
Leo P (AGC 208583 ) is a small irregular galaxy discovered in 2013. It is only 0.4 Mpc from the Sextans B, so it is considered as a member of this grouping. It is the most distant member of all, with a distance of 5.3 million light years.

Antlia B 
Antlia B is recently discovered small galaxy. It is known to be a satellite of NGC 3109.

References

See also 
 List of nearest galaxies

Galaxies
NGC 3109 subgroup